Otto Herrigel (27 June 1937 – 13 May 2013) was a Namibian businessman, and politician. He served as Namibia's first Minister of Finance between 1990 and 1992.

Herrigel was born in Walvis Bay and grew up in Swakopmund. He studied economics at University of Heidelberg, and in 1971 obtained a doctoral degree from University of Basel, his thesis was about the demographic and economic development of South West Africa since 1921.

A member of SWAPO since before Independence of Namibia, Herrigel worked as a businessman and farmer, before he was appointed Namibia's first Minister of Finance on 21 March 1990. Prominent businessman and then-Chairman of the Chamber of Commerce Harold Pupkewitz commented "Dr Herrigel [is a] man of decision-making abilities and sound judgement". Herrigel resigned in 1992, reportedly due to differences with president Sam Nujoma over fiscal policy and the procurement of a presidential aircraft. Afterwards Herrigel was on the board of the Bank of Namibia (1998-2008), and on the board of directors of TransNamib (2001-2002).

Herrigel and his wife Karin raised two GDR kids as foster children, children that were removed from their parents and brought up in the German Democratic Republic.

References

1937 births
2013 deaths
Finance ministers of Namibia
Members of the National Assembly (Namibia)
Government ministers of Namibia
SWAPO politicians
Heidelberg University alumni
University of Basel alumni
People from Walvis Bay
Namibian people of German descent
White Namibian people